The Azov tadpole goby (Benthophilus magistri) is a species of goby native to the basin of the Sea of Azov, specifically in the near-estuary zone of the Kuban River, to west until Ukrainian part of the Taganrog Bay  and the Strait of Kerch, in the Mius estuary, Yeya estuary, and Akhtanizovskii Liman.  This species is only found on silty estuarine bottoms.  It can reach a length of  TL.

References

Benthophilus
Fish of Europe
Fish of Russia
Fish described in 1927